Tereza Mrdeža (born 14 November 1990) is a Croatian tennis player.

She has won eight singles and four doubles titles on the ITF Women's Circuit. On 12 October 2015, she reached her best singles ranking of world  150. On 23 April 2018, she peaked at No. 163 in the doubles rankings.

Playing for Croatia Fed Cup team, Mrdeža has a win–loss record of 5–4.

Grand Slam performance timeline

Singles

ITF Circuit finals

Singles: 26 (8 titles, 18 runner–ups)

Doubles: 15 (4 titles, 11 runner–ups)

Fed Cup/Billie Jean King Cup participation

Singles (1–3)

Doubles (4–1)

References

External links

 
 
 

1990 births
Living people
Sportspeople from Pula
Croatian female tennis players
21st-century Croatian women